The following are the association football events of the year 1889 throughout the world.

Events
 The Danish Football Association is founded.

Clubs founded

America
 Argentina
Rosario Central

Asia
 India
Mohun Bagan AC

Europe

Bath City
Brentford
Crook Town
Middlesbrough Ironopolis
Sheffield United
Torquay United
Wimbledon
Woking

Glenavon
Larne

Recreativo Huelva

National Championship winners

Asia

India
Durand Cup Winners:
Highland Light Infantry

Europe

England
Football League Winners:
Preston North End
FA Cup Winners:
Preston North End

Ireland
Irish Cup Winners:
Lisburn Distillery

Netherlands
Football League Winners:
VV Concordia

Scotland
Scottish Cup Winners:
Third Lanarkshire RV

Wales
Welsh Cup Winners:
Bangor City

International tournaments

Europe
British Home Championship
Winners: 
Runners-Up:

Births
 25 May – Jan van Dort (d. 1967), Netherlands international forward in five matches (1920).
 25 June – Joe Smith (d. 1971), England international forward in five matches (1913–1920).

References

 
Association football by year